Elizabeth Anne Broadbent  is a full professor of health psychology at the University of Auckland. She was elected as a Fellow of the Royal Society Te Apārangi in 2021.

Academic career 
Broadbent initially trained as an electronic engineer at the University of Canterbury, completing a Bachelor of Engineering degree with Honours (Electrical and Electronic). She worked at companies Transpower, Électricité de Tahiti, and Robotechnology before continuing her education with a graduate Diploma of Arts from Massey University, and Master of Arts and Doctor of Philosophy degrees at the University of Auckland. Her 2002 master's thesis was on the effects of stress, social support and beliefs on wound healing following surgery. Her PhD thesis, completed in 2005, was titled New approaches to the assessment of illness perceptions.

Broadbent was promoted to full professor at the University of Auckland in 2019.

Broadbent has worked on how robots might help in school situations, both in the classroom and the sick bay, and also how might robots help patients managing chronic lung condition COPD. About 75% of patients in a controlled trial found that having robot assistance at home helped with medication adherence and companionship. Her work on how writing can help recovery from injury and weightloss surgery has been featured in Scientific American Mind, Time magazine, and The Guardian.

Awards 
Broadbent was elected as a Fellow of the Royal Society Te Apārangi in 2021. The Society said "One of her most notable contributions is the development and testing of healthcare robots, especially for improving outcomes in rest-home and dementia care and chronic illness...this is innovative interdisciplinary work of exceptional quality".

Selected publications

References

External links 

 Broadbent's inaugural professorial lecture, 2019

New Zealand academics
University of Canterbury alumni
University of Auckland alumni
Fellows of the Royal Society of New Zealand
Academic staff of the University of Auckland
New Zealand psychologists
Year of birth missing (living people)
Living people